International Academy of Genealogy is an international organization dedicated to genealogy, headquartered in Paris. It was created on 22 September 1998 during a constitutive meeting held in Turin, Italy. Founder of the Academy and initiator of the constitutive meeting is the French  genealogist and heraldrist Jean-Marie Thiébaud.

Purpose
The Academy was created to encourage, coordinate, promote and support the genealogic studies from all over the world. It also organizes international meetings in order to promote the genealogy as one of the important branches of the social studies in human history.

Members
Academy has full members, called academicians, whose number is limited to 100 and associate members, whose number is unlimited. The full members have the right to vote, but the associate members do not. However, the associate members may participate at all events and may express their opinions.

References, notes

External links
 Gene Academy  - International Academy of Genealogy (own website)
 An example of lineage - The today descendants of Guillaume le Conquérant
 Alt Genealogy
 Supplement of the magazine Nobiltà, Rivista di Araldica, Genealogia, Ordini Cavallereschi, Bologna, Italy

Organizations established in 1998
Genealogical societies
Organizations based in Paris